Trimenia  may refer to:
 Trimenia (butterfly), a genus of butterfly in the family Lycaenidae
 Trimenia (plant), a genus of plants in the family Trimeniaceae